"Come and Get Your Love" is a song by American rock band Redbone. The song was originally released as a promo track under the name "Hail" and was later featured on their fifth album, Wovoka (1973), under its current name. The song was released as the album's first single the following year. Written and produced by band members Pat and Lolly Vegas, it is one of the band's most successful singles. It made them the first Native American band to reach the top five on the Billboard Hot 100, reaching number five. The song later appeared on many "greatest hits" albums released by the band, as well as on numerous compilation albums of the 1970s. A music video was released in 2020.

The single cut is significantly shorter, with the album version featuring an introductory slow part, plus a longer repeated coda. Most radio stations rarely play the latter. The song features a prominent part for electric sitar. A shorter DJ re-service edit of the single version is mainly distinguished by a lead vocal. During George Michael’s tenure as a disc jockey on New York's WABC radio from September 1974 to November 1979, he would routinely begin his Friday night show with this song which he dubbed the "weekend national anthem".

Chart performance
The song peaked at number five on the Billboard Hot 100 chart on April 13, 1974.  It spent 18 weeks in the Top 40 and landed as the fourth-most popular song on the Hot 100 for 1974. The single was certified gold by the RIAA on April 22, 1974, which indicates that it had shipped over a million copies in North America. The song is Redbone's highest charting single and one of two Top 40 hits by the band. (An earlier recording, "The Witch Queen of New Orleans," peaked at number 21 in 1972.)

In France, the single peaked at number 177 on the singles sales chart (physical sales + downloads) in 2017. The following year, Redbone's version featured in a Christmas 2018 media advertising campaign from Bouygues, the French telecommunications company, and the song soon rose to the top of the pop charts. It entered the downloads chart's Top 10, and reached number one on the singles sales chart at the end of the year. It also peaked at number 20 on the singles chart (downloads plus streaming) during the last week of the year.

In 2014, "Come and Get Your Love" experienced a resurgence in popularity when it was featured in the Marvel Studios film Guardians of the Galaxy as one of the songs on a mixtape made for the protagonist Peter Quill. It was also included on the film's soundtrack album, which reached the top spot on the Billboard 200 chart. In 2015, "Come and Get Your Love" was used on Netflix's adult animated sitcom F Is for Family on its theme song with Redbone. It was also heard and reused in the 2019 film Avengers: Endgame.

In August of 2021, the song was prominently featured in Season 1, Episode 5, “Come and Get Your Love”, of Reservation Dogs on the streaming service Hulu, with the band Redbone performing the song at the end of the episode.

Personnel 

 Lolly Vegas – lead guitar, electric sitar, vocals
 Tony Bellamy – rhythm guitar, piano, background vocals
 Pat Vegas – bass, background vocals
 Butch Rillera – drums, background vocals

Additional personnel 

 Gene Page – orchestrator
 Joe Sample - piano, vibraphone
 Eddie Caciedo - percussion

Charts

Weekly charts

Year-end charts

Certifications

Real McCoy version

In 1995, German Eurodance project Real McCoy released a cover version of "Come and Get Your Love", which was released in the United States in May 1995 as the third single from their North American debut album, Another Night (1995). It peaked at number 19 on the US Billboard Hot 100 and number-one on the Billboard Hot Dance Club Play chart in August same year. 

The B-side of the single was "Megablast", a song which had previously appeared on their 1994 album Space Invaders. North American releases of the single denoted it as a "bonus track not available on the album", as the song hadn't been released in that territory. It was later added to international releases of the Another Night album.

Critical reception
Larry Flick from Billboard commented, "The act has a field day with a nearly forgotten '70s pop nugget made famous by Redbone—we are dying to meet the nostalgic mind that came up with such a genius cover choice. Mixes are forthcoming. We are waiting with tambourine in hand." James Richliano from The Boston Globe felt it is "infectiously urbanized here for the '90s". Dave Sholin from the Gavin Report wrote, "Based on immediate programmer reaction, it seemed destined that this cover of Redbone's 1974 hit would be the obvious follow-up to the trio's hits 'Another Night' and 'Runaway'. Polishing it up '90s-style gives the group a clear shot at plenty of radio and club play for the summer ahead." 

James Masterton viewed it as "typical Euro dance, an uptempo beat, a high powered rap and a catchy female vocal, this time one which is too similar to Cyndi Lauper's "(Hey Now) Girls Just Wanna Have Fun" to be accidental but that is not to detract from the success of the track." A reviewer from Music Week rated it four out of five, calling it "a cute and catchy track which is guaranteed to give Ojay, Vanessa and Patsy a fourth worldwide hit." The magazine's Alan Jones noted that the "jaunty remake incorporates techno-edged synths, house rhythms, ragga rapping and – somewhere in the mix – enough elements of the original, highly infectious song to be sure of their fourth hit in a row."

Music video
A music video was produced to promote the single, directed by American music video director Wayne Isham. It was later published on Real McCoy's official YouTube channel in October 2006. The video has amassed more than 4 million views as of September 2021.

Track listing

 12", Europe (1995)
"Come and Get Your Love" (Long Version) – 4:53
"Come and Get Your Love" (NRG-Mix) – 5:10

 CD single, UK (1995)
"Come and Get Your Love" (Radio Edit) – 3:12
"Come and Get Your Love" (Junior Vasquez Edit) – 4:00
"Come and Get Your Love" (Tzant Remix) – 7:32
"Come and Get Your Love" (Junior Vasquez Dub) – 7:01
"Come and Get Your Love" (Euro Mix) – 5:11
"Come and Get Your Love" (Tzant Euromix) – 7:41

 CD maxi, Europe (1995)
"Come and Get Your Love" (Radio Edit) – 3:14
"Come and Get Your Love" (Long Version) – 4:53
"Come and Get Your Love" (NRG-Mix) – 5:10
"Megablast" – 5:09

Charts

Bibliography
The Billboard Book of Top 40 Hits, 9th Edition, 2010, 
The Billboard Book of #1 Hits, 5th Edition, 2003,

References

1974 singles
1995 singles
Real McCoy (band) songs
1973 songs
Arista Records singles
Epic Records singles
Boys Town Gang songs
Redbone (band) songs
Animated series theme songs
Comedy television theme songs
Animated music videos
Music videos directed by Wayne Isham